David Howard Lanz (born June 28, 1950, in Seattle, Washington) is a Grammy-nominated pianist and composer. His album Cristofori's Dream topped the New Age music charts in 1988.

Early years
Lanz attributes his interest in the piano to experiences during his childhood in the Pacific Northwest. He was inspired to play piano by his mother. She played songs by Ray Charles, Frank Sinatra, and Nat King Cole on the piano and became his first musical mentor.

Lanz started his performing career as a teenager during the 1960s. In 1971, he recorded an album for Mercury Records with the Canadian group Brahman. He played keyboards on the hit song "Seasons in the Sun" by Terry Jacks. In the late 1970s, he was musical director for the Seattle band the Sweep, with Ken McCann as singer, Peter Pendras on lead guitar, Glenn Ayers on drums, and Hugh Gerrard on bass. Saxophonist Robbie Jordan was added to the group after a gig in Boise, Idaho.

Lanz shifted to playing solo acts in local clubs. At a nightclub in Seattle, he began to perform his own compositions and moved from rock to jazz and blues.

Recording career
The 1980s saw the birth of a new type of musical talent in Lanz. During this time, with the help of a friend, he began composing what would now be considered New Age music. From the 1980s onward, he has released a steady stream of albums, including his ground-breaking album Heartsounds, his first solo album, which boosted the popularity of his record label, Narada.

Style
Lanz's goal is to have his music create an atmosphere of hope and enlightenment. In an interview with Barnes & Noble, Lanz stated that he wanted to create an atmosphere similar to that of Steven Halpern's music, but with a "more popular hook in it".

Lanz has said, "[The piano] is the most divinely inspired instrument on the planet. It presents a great attraction to our left-right brain relationship. My goal is to create entertainment that also provides hope and enlightenment."

In the front of his Musicbook, The David Lanz Collection, he writes: "At the piano, I'm able to communicate in a way that is very intimate and direct. My approach at music is a bit like talking to a friend. You don't have to be very complicated when you speak. If you say what's in your heart, it's usually very simple."

Lanz's style spans the popular songbook as well. His 2009 release, "Liverpool: Re-imagining The Beatles", made with Xiao flute master Gary Stroutsos pays homage to the music of The Beatles.

Discography

Studio albums
 1983 Heartsounds
 1985 Nightfall
 1985 Natural States (with Paul Speer)
 1985 Solstice (with Michael Jones)
 1987 Woodlands (with Tingstad and Rumbel)
 1987 Desert Vision (with Paul Speer)
 1988 Cristofori's Dream
 1990 Skyline Firedance
 1991 Return to the Heart
 1993 Bridge of Dreams (with Paul Speer)
 1994 Christmas Eve
 1996 Sacred Road
 1996 Convergence (with David Arkenstone)
 1998 Songs from an English Garden
 1999 An Evening with David Lanz
 1999 Cristofori's Dream (remastered with additional track)
 1999 The Christmas Album
 1999 East of the Moon
 2002 Finding Paradise
 2003 The Symphonic Sessions
 2004 The Good Life
 2005 Spirit Romance
 2006 Sacred Road Revisited
 2007 A Cup of Moonlight (revised official release with additional tracks - 2003 limited website edition)
 2008 Living Temples
 2008 Painting the Sun
 2009 Liverpool: Re-imagining the Beatles
 2011 Here Comes the Sun
 2011 Here Comes the Sun (solo piano edition)
 2012 Christofori's Dream Re-envisioned
 2012 Joy Noel
 2013 Movements of the Heart
 2014 Forever Christmas (compilation with Kristin Amarie)
 2015 Silhouettes of Love (compilation with Kristin Amarie)
 2016 Norwegian Rain
 2017 French Impressions
 2020 Water Sign
 2022 Lettere D'amore - Letters of Love (with Kristin Amarie)

Singles
 2000 Angel in My Stocking – Limited Edition

Live albums
 2010 Liverpool Trio: Live in Seoul

Compilation albums
 1995 Beloved: A David Lanz Collection
 2001 Love Songs
 2002 Romantic: The Ultimate David Lanz Collection
 2003 Heartsounds/Nightfall (rereleased/remastered)
 2005 The Best of David Lanz

Compilation appearances
20 Years of Narada Piano
Grand Piano (Narada Anniversary Collection)
Narada Smooth Jazz
Narada Film and Television Music Sampler

See also 
 List of ambient music artists

Sources
David Lanz, "Solos for New Age Piano" copyright 1991 NARADA Music Inc. pp. 2–3

External links
 www.davidlanz.com — official site

Musicians from Seattle
1950 births
Living people
New-age pianists
Narada Productions artists
People from Pittsford, New York
20th-century American pianists
American male pianists
21st-century American pianists
20th-century American male musicians
21st-century American male musicians